The 2022–23 Drake Bulldogs men's basketball team represented Drake University in the 2022–23 NCAA Division I men's basketball season. The Bulldogs, led by fifth-year head coach Darian DeVries, played their home games at the Knapp Center in Des Moines, Iowa as members of the Missouri Valley Conference (MVC). They finished the regular season 27–7, 15–5 in MVC play to finish in second place. In the MVC tournament, they defeated Murray State, Southern Illinois, and Bradley to win the tournament championship. As a result, they received the conference's automatic bid to the NCAA tournament, where they were defeated by Miami (FL) in the first round.

Previous season
The Bulldogs finished the 2021–22 season 22–9, 13–5 in MVC play to finish in a tie for second place. As the No. 3 seed in the MVC tournament, they defeated Southern Illinois in the quarterfinals and Missouri State in the semifinals before losing to Loyola in the championship. The Bulldogs accepted an invitation to the College Basketball Invitational and earned the No. 1 overall seed. They defeated Purdue Fort Wayne in the first round before losing to UNC Wilmington in the quarterfinals.

Offseason

Departures

Incoming transfers

Preseason 
The Bulldogs were picked to finish first in the conference's preseason poll. Forward Tucker DeVries was named MVC Preseason Player of the Year and selected to the preseason All-MVC first team.

Roster

Schedule and results

|-
!colspan=9 style=| Exhibition

|-
!colspan=9 style=| Regular season
|-

|-
!colspan=12 style=| MVC Tournament

|-
!colspan=12 style=| NCAA Tournament

Source

Rankings

References

Drake Bulldogs men's basketball seasons
Drake
Drake
Drake
Drake